George Street, at the confluence of the A305 and A307 roads, is the high street in Richmond, London and was one of the first streets to be developed in the town. Previously known as Great Street, it was renamed after King George III in 1769. Buildings on the street include the Grade II listed Greyhound House, formerly
the Greyhound Hotel, in a building dating from the 1730s. The facade of the former General Post Office building at 70–72 George Street, now a retail store, incorporates the coat of arms of the former Municipal Borough of Richmond, which existed from 1890 to 1965.

Number 29, now a Tesco Metro, was built in 1896 by the brothers Alfred and Harold Wright as a drapers shop. It developed into the first department store in Richmond, Wright Brothers Ltd, in 1929. Wright Brothers was purchased by Hide & Co Ltd, of Kingston, in 1940; they were taken over by House of Fraser in 1975, and the department store was sold to Owen Owen in 1976 and closed in 1990.

Number 80 George Street was the site of J H Gosling & Sons, department store, founded as a drapers by John Hunt Gosling in 1796. The site expanded to include 75-79. In 1947 it was taken over by John Barker & Co. (later acquired by House of Fraser in 1957); it was demolished in 1968 after being damaged in a fire. It reopened as Dickins & Jones on completion of new building 1970; renamed House of Fraser 2007; closed in 2020 and is now undergoing redevelopment.

The street is one-way eastbound. Westbound traffic uses Eton Street, Paradise Road and Red Lion Street.

Memorial plaque
At Barclays Bank a memorial plaque, relocated in 2014 from the bank's former branch in  Ham,  commemorates Angela Woolliscroft, a bank teller who was murdered in 1976 during a bank robbery at the Ham branch. It reads: "In fond memory of Angela Woolliscroft who died on 10th November 1976. A member of staff of this branch who will always be remembered by her colleagues."

Gallery

References

Further reading
 140 pages. .

External links
Aerial view: the junction of King Street and George Street, Richmond, August 1928	

 
Barclays
High Streets
Richmond, London
Shopping streets in London
Streets in the London Borough of Richmond upon Thames